Six Silver Strings is the thirtieth studio blues album by B.B. King released in 1985. Promoted as a King's 50th album, the production is split between five David Crawford-produced tracks recorded in Miami with session musicians, and three tracks co-produced by filmmaker John Landis and his Into the Night soundtrack colleague Ira Newborn.

In a retrospective review AllMusic criticized the lackluster "pop rock" work shown in the Crawford-produced tracks, with uninspired performances from King, but praised the tunes from the Landis/Newborn session, calling "My Lucille" an "underrated signature classic." "My Lucille" was used in the film Into the Night in a scene where the lead male character walks into a bar.

Track listing
"Six Silver Strings" (David Crawford, Luther Dixon) – 4:22
"Big Boss Man" (Dixon, Al Smith) – 4:48
"In the Midnight Hour" (Steve Cropper, Wilson Pickett) – 3:24
"Into the Night" (Ira Newborn) – 4:12
"My Lucille" (Newborn) – 3:42
"Memory Lane" (Crawford, Dixon) – 4:35
"My Guitar Sings the Blues" (Crawford, Dixon) – 3:39
"Double Trouble" (Crawford, Dixon) – 5:14

References

1985 albums
B.B. King albums
MCA Records albums